William Murray (1796–?) was a British Conservative politician who sat in the House of Commons from 1859 to 1865.

At the 1859 general election Murray was elected unopposed as one of the two Members of Parliament (MPs) for Newcastle-under-Lyme. However, he did not stand again at the 1865 general election.

References

External links 

1796 births
Conservative Party (UK) MPs for English constituencies
UK MPs 1859–1865
Year of death unknown
Members of the Parliament of the United Kingdom for Newcastle-under-Lyme